This is a year-by-year list of Topps All-Star Rookie Teams. Note that players selected for a particular team appear in the following year's set release. So, a player named to the 2022 Topps All-Star Rookie team will have a trophy symbol on his 2023 Topps baseball card.

1950s
1959
Johnny Romano, C, Chicago White Sox
Willie McCovey, 1B, San Francisco Giants †
Pumpsie Green, 2B, Boston Red Sox
Jim Baxes, 3B, Cleveland Indians
Joe Koppe, SS, Philadelphia Phillies
Bob Allison, OF, Washington Senators
Ron Fairly, OF, Los Angeles Dodgers
Willie Tasby, OF, Baltimore Orioles
Jim Perry, RHP, Cleveland Indians
Jim O'Toole, LHP, Cincinnati Reds

1960s

1960
Jimmie Coker, C, Philadelphia Phillies
Jim Gentile, 1B, Baltimore Orioles
Julián Javier, 2B, St. Louis Cardinals
Ron Santo, 3B, Chicago Cubs †
Ron Hansen, SS, Baltimore Orioles
Tony Curry, OF, Philadelphia Phillies
Tommy Davis, OF, Los Angeles Dodgers
Frank Howard, OF, Los Angeles Dodgers
Chuck Estrada, RHP, Baltimore Orioles
Dick Stigman, LHP, Cleveland Indians

1961
Joe Torre, C, Milwaukee Braves † (as a manager)
J. C. Martin, 1B, Chicago White Sox
Jake Wood, 2B, Detroit Tigers
Charley Smith, 3B, Chicago White Sox
Dick Howser, SS, Kansas City Athletics
Floyd Robinson, OF, Chicago White Sox
Lee Thomas, OF, Los Angeles Angels
Billy Williams, OF, Chicago Cubs †
Don Schwall, RHP, Boston Red Sox
Jack Curtis, LHP, Chicago Cubs

1962
Bob Rodgers, C, Los Angeles Angels
Fred Whitfield, 1B, Cleveland Indians
Bernie Allen, 2B, Minnesota Twins
Ed Charles, 3B, Kansas City Athletics
Tom Tresh, SS, New York Yankees
Manny Jiménez, OF, Kansas City Athletics
Al Luplow, OF, Cleveland Indians
Boog Powell, OF, Baltimore Orioles
Dean Chance, RHP, Los Angeles Angels
Al Jackson, LHP, New York Mets

1963
Jesse Gonder, C, New York Mets
Rusty Staub, 1B, Houston Colt .45's
Pete Rose, 2B, Cincinnati Reds
Pete Ward, 3B, Chicago White Sox
Al Weis, SS, Chicago White Sox
Vic Davalillo, OF, Cleveland Indians
Jimmie Hall, OF, Minnesota Twins
Tommy Harper, OF, Cincinnati Reds
Ray Culp, RHP, Philadelphia Phillies
Gary Peters, LHP, Chicago White Sox

1964
Mike Brumley, C, Washington Senators
Bob Chance, 1B, Washington Senators
Hal Lanier, 2B, San Francisco Giants
Richie Allen, 3B, Philadelphia Phillies
Bert Campaneris, SS, Kansas City Athletics
Rico Carty, OF, Milwaukee Braves
Tony Conigliaro, OF, Boston Red Sox
Tony Oliva, OF, Minnesota Twins †
Wally Bunker, RHP, Baltimore Orioles
Bill McCool, LHP, Cincinnati Reds

1965
Pat Corrales, C, St. Louis Cardinals
Tony Pérez, 1B, Cincinnati Reds †
Joe Morgan, 2B, Houston Astros †
Paul Schaal, 3B, California Angels
Rico Petrocelli, SS, Boston Red Sox
Curt Blefary, OF, Baltimore Orioles
José Cardenal, OF, California Angels
Ron Swoboda, OF, New York Mets
Frank Linzy, RHP, San Francisco Giants
Marcelino López, LHP, California Angels

1966
Randy Hundley, C, Chicago Cubs
George Scott, 1B, Boston Red Sox
Davey Johnson, 2B, Baltimore Orioles
Tommy Helms, 3B, Cincinnati Reds
Sonny Jackson, SS, Houston Astros
Tommie Agee, OF, Chicago White Sox
Byron Browne, OF, Chicago Cubs
Cleon Jones, OF, New York Mets
Jim Nash, RHP, Kansas City Athletics
Woodie Fryman, LHP, Pittsburgh Pirates

1967
Dick Dietz, C, San Francisco Giants
Lee May, 1B, Cincinnati Reds
Rod Carew, 2B, Minnesota Twins †
Bobby Etheridge, 3B, San Francisco Giants
Tim Cullen, SS, Washington Senators
Rick Monday, OF, Oakland Athletics
Reggie Smith, OF, Boston Red Sox
Walt Williams, OF Chicago White Sox
Dick Hughes, RHP, St. Louis Cardinals
Tom Seaver, RHP, New York Mets †
Rich Nye, LHP, Chicago Cubs

1968
Johnny Bench, C, Cincinnati Reds †
Gary Holman, 1B, Washington Senators
Dave Nelson, 2B, Cleveland Indians
Ken Boswell, 2B,  New York Mets
Bobby Cox, 3B, New York Yankees † (as a manager)
Héctor Torres, SS, Houston Astros
Bobby Bonds, OF, San Francisco Giants
Dave Marshall, OF, San Francisco Giants
Del Unser, OF, Washington Senators
Stan Bahnsen, RHP, New York Yankees
Jerry Koosman, LHP, New York Mets

1969
Bob Didier, C, Atlanta Braves
Al Oliver, 1B, Pittsburgh Pirates
Ted Sizemore, 2B, Los Angeles Dodgers
Coco Laboy, 3B, Montreal Expos
Don Money, SS, Philadelphia Phillies
Larry Hisle, OF, Philadelphia Phillies
Carlos May, OF, Chicago White Sox
Lou Piniella, OF, Kansas City Royals
Mike Nagy, RHP, Boston Red Sox
Bill Butler, LHP, Kansas City Royals

1970s

1970
Thurman Munson, C, New York Yankees
John Ellis, 1B, New York Yankees
Dave Cash, 2B, Pittsburgh Pirates
Al Gallagher, 3B, San Francisco Giants
Larry Bowa, SS, Philadelphia Phillies
Bernie Carbo, OF, Cincinnati Reds
Billy Conigliaro, OF, Boston Red Sox
Roy Foster, OF, Cleveland Indians
Carl Morton, RHP, Montreal Expos
Les Cain, LHP, Detroit Tigers

1971
Earl Williams, C, Atlanta Braves
Chris Chambliss, 1B, Cleveland Indians
Doug Griffin, 2B, Boston Red Sox
Steve Braun, 3B, Minnesota Twins
Chris Speier, SS, San Francisco Giants
Bill Buckner, OF, Los Angeles Dodgers
Ángel Mangual, OF, Oakland Athletics
Willie Montañez, OF, Philadelphia Phillies
Bill Parsons, RHP, Milwaukee Brewers
Ross Grimsley, LHP, Cincinnati Reds

1972
Carlton Fisk, C, Boston Red Sox †
Tom Hutton, 1B, Philadelphia Phillies
Jack Brohamer, 2B, Cleveland Indians
Dave Roberts, 3B, San Diego Padres
Dwain Anderson, SS, St. Louis Cardinals
Don Baylor, OF, Baltimore Orioles
Buddy Bell, OF, Cleveland Indians
Garry Maddox, OF, San Francisco Giants
Dick Tidrow, RHP, Cleveland Indians
Jon Matlack, LHP, New York Mets

1973
Bob Boone, C, Philadelphia Phillies
Gary Thomasson, 1B, San Francisco Giants
Dave Lopes, 2B, Los Angeles Dodgers
Dan Driessen, 3B, Cincinnati Reds
Jerry Terrell, SS, Minnesota Twins
Rich Coggins, OF, Baltimore Orioles
Johnny Grubb, OF, San Diego Padres
Gary Matthews, OF, San Francisco Giants
Steve Rogers, RHP, Montreal Expos
Randy Jones, LHP, San Diego Padres

1974
Barry Foote, C, Montreal Expos
Mike Hargrove, 1B, Texas Rangers
Larry Milbourne, 2B, Houston Astros
Bill Madlock, 3B, Chicago Cubs
Bucky Dent, SS, Chicago White Sox
Greg Gross, OF, Houston Astros
Bake McBride, OF, St. Louis Cardinals
Claudell Washington, OF, Oakland Athletics
John D'Acquisto, RHP, San Francisco Giants
Frank Tanana, LHP, California Angels

1975
Gary Carter, C, Montreal Expos†
Mike Ivie, 1B, San Diego Padres
Jerry Remy, 2B, California Angels
Larry Parrish, 3B, Montreal Expos
Tom Veryzer, SS, Detroit Tigers
Dan Ford, OF, Minnesota Twins
Fred Lynn, OF, Boston Red Sox
Jim Rice, OF, Boston Red Sox †
John Montefusco, RHP, San Francisco Giants
Tom Underwood, LHP, Philadelphia Phillies

1976
Butch Wynegar, C, Minnesota Twins
Jason Thompson, 1B, Detroit Tigers
Willie Randolph, 2B, New York Yankees
Jerry Royster, 3B, Atlanta Braves
Garry Templeton, SS, St. Louis Cardinals
Larry Herndon, OF, San Francisco Giants
Chet Lemon, OF, Chicago White Sox
Tom Poquette, OF, Kansas City Royals
Mark Fidrych, RHP, Detroit Tigers
Jerry Augustine, LHP, Milwaukee Brewers

1977
Gary Alexander, C, San Francisco Giants
Doug Ault, 1B, Toronto Blue Jays
Bump Wills, 2B, Texas Rangers
Wayne Gross, 3B, Oakland Athletics
Bob Bailor, SS, Toronto Blue Jays
Andre Dawson, OF, Montreal Expos †
Ruppert Jones, OF, Seattle Mariners
Mitchell Page, OF, Oakland Athletics
Dave Rozema, RHP, Detroit Tigers
Jerry Garvin, LHP, Toronto Blue Jays
Eddie Murray, DH, Baltimore Orioles †

1978
Bill Nahorodny, C, Chicago White Sox
Dave Revering, 1B, Oakland Athletics
Paul Molitor, 2B, Milwaukee Brewers †
Bob Horner, 3B, Atlanta Braves
Ozzie Smith, SS, San Diego Padres †
Rick Bosetti, OF, Toronto Blue Jays
Bob Molinaro, OF, Chicago White Sox
Hosken Powell, OF, Minnesota Twins
Rich Gale, RHP, Kansas City Royals
John Johnson, LHP, Oakland Athletics

1979
Steve Nicosia, C, Pittsburgh Pirates
Pat Putnam, 1B, Texas Rangers
Danny Ainge, 2B, Toronto Blue Jays
John Castino, 3B, Minnesota Twins
Alfredo Griffin, SS, Toronto Blue Jays
Jeff Leonard, OF, Houston Astros
Billy Sample, OF, Texas Rangers
Scot Thompson, OF, Chicago Cubs
Mark Clear, RHP, California Angels
Ross Baumgarten, LHP, Chicago White Sox

1980s

1980
Dan Graham, C, Baltimore Orioles
Rich Murray, 1B, San Francisco Giants
Damaso Garcia, 2B, Toronto Blue Jays
Glenn Hoffman, 3B, Boston Red Sox
Ron Oester, SS, Cincinnati Reds
Joe Charboneau, OF, Cleveland Indians
Rick Peters, OF, Detroit Tigers
Lonnie Smith, OF, Philadelphia Phillies
Doug Corbett, RHP, Minnesota Twins
Britt Burns, LHP, Chicago White Sox

1981
Tony Peña, C, Pittsburgh Pirates
Tim Wallach, 1B, Montreal Expos
Juan Bonilla, 2B, San Diego Padres
Hubie Brooks, 3B, New York Mets
Cal Ripken Jr., SS, Baltimore Orioles †
Rufino Linares, OF, Atlanta Braves
Tim Raines, OF, Montreal Expos †
Mookie Wilson, OF, New York Mets
Bruce Berenyi, RHP, Cincinnati Reds
Fernando Valenzuela, LHP, Los Angeles Dodgers

1982
Tim Laudner, C, Minnesota Twins
Kent Hrbek, 1B, Minnesota Twins
Steve Sax, 2B, Los Angeles Dodgers
Ryne Sandberg, 3B, Chicago Cubs †
Cal Ripken Jr., SS, Baltimore Orioles †
Tom Brunansky, OF, Minnesota Twins
Chili Davis, OF, San Francisco Giants
Willie McGee, OF, St. Louis Cardinals
Bill Laskey, RHP, San Francisco Giants
Ed Vande Berg, LHP, Seattle Mariners

1983
Bob Kearney, C, Oakland Athletics
Greg Brock, 1B, Los Angeles Dodgers
Bill Doran, 2B, Houston Astros
Nick Esasky, 3B, Cincinnati Reds
Julio Franco, SS, Cleveland Indians
Mel Hall, OF, Chicago Cubs
Ron Kittle, OF, Chicago White Sox
Darryl Strawberry, OF, New York Mets
Mike Boddicker, RHP, Baltimore Orioles
Matt Young, LHP, Seattle Mariners

1984
Mike Fitzgerald, C, New York Mets
Alvin Davis, 1B, Seattle Mariners
Juan Samuel, 2B, Philadelphia Phillies
Brook Jacoby, 3B, Cleveland Indians
Jackie Gutiérrez, SS, Boston Red Sox
Dan Gladden, OF, San Francisco Giants
Carmelo Martínez, OF, San Diego Padres
Kirby Puckett, OF, Minnesota Twins †
Dwight Gooden, RHP, New York Mets
Mark Langston, LHP, Seattle Mariners

1985
 Mark Salas, C, Minnesota Twins
 Glenn Davis, 1B, Houston Astros
 Ernest Riles, 2B, Milwaukee Brewers
 Chris Brown, 3B, San Francisco Giants
 Ozzie Guillén, SS, Chicago White Sox
 Vince Coleman, OF, St. Louis Cardinals
 Oddibe McDowell, OF, Texas Rangers
 Larry Sheets, OF, Baltimore Orioles
 Brian Fisher, RHP, New York Yankees
 Roger McDowell, RHP, New York Mets
 Tom Browning, LHP, Cincinnati Reds

1986
Andy Allanson, C, Cleveland Indians
Wally Joyner, 1B, California Angels
Robby Thompson, 2B, San Francisco Giants
Dale Sveum, 3B, Milwaukee Brewers
Andrés Thomas, SS, Atlanta Braves
José Canseco, OF, Oakland Athletics
Pete Incaviglia, OF, Texas Rangers
Cory Snyder, OF, Cleveland Indians
Danny Tartabull, OF, Seattle Mariners
Todd Worrell, RHP, St. Louis Cardinals
Bruce Ruffin, LHP, Philadelphia Phillies

1987
Matt Nokes, C, Detroit Tigers
Mark McGwire, 1B, Oakland Athletics
Casey Candaele, 2B, Montreal Expos
Kevin Seitzer, 3B, Kansas City Royals
Al Pedrique, SS, Pittsburgh Pirates
Ellis Burks, OF, Boston Red Sox
Mike Greenwell, OF, Boston Red Sox
Devon White, OF, California Angels
Mike Dunne, RHP, Pittsburgh Pirates
Jeff Musselman, LHP, Toronto Blue Jays

1988
Damon Berryhill, C, Chicago Cubs
Mark Grace, 1B, Chicago Cubs
Ron Gant, 2B, Atlanta Braves
Chris Sabo, 3B, Cincinnati Reds
Walt Weiss, SS, Oakland Athletics
Jay Buhner, OF, Seattle Mariners
Cecil Espy, OF, Texas Rangers
Dave Gallagher, OF, Chicago White Sox
Tim Belcher, RHP, Los Angeles Dodgers
Paul Gibson, LHP, Detroit Tigers

1989
Bob Geren, C, New York Yankees
Carlos Martínez, 1B, Chicago White Sox
Gregg Jefferies, 2B, New York Mets
Craig Worthington, 3B, Baltimore Orioles
Gary Sheffield, SS, Milwaukee Brewers
Greg Briley, OF, Seattle Mariners
Ken Griffey Jr., OF, Seattle Mariners †
Jerome Walton, OF, Chicago Cubs
Tom Gordon, RHP, Kansas City Royals
Jim Abbott, LHP, California Angels

1990s

1990
Sandy Alomar Jr., C, Cleveland Indians
Hal Morris, 1B, Cincinnati Reds
Delino DeShields, 2B, Montreal Expos
Robin Ventura, 3B, Chicago White Sox
Jeff Huson, SS, Texas Rangers
Félix José, OF, St. Louis Cardinals
David Justice, OF, Atlanta Braves
Larry Walker, OF, Montreal Expos †
Kevin Appier, RHP, Kansas City Royals
Scott Radinsky, LHP, Chicago White Sox

1991
Iván Rodríguez, C, Texas Rangers †
Jeff Bagwell, 1B, Houston Astros †
Chuck Knoblauch, 2B, Minnesota Twins
Leo Gómez, 3B, Baltimore Orioles
Andújar Cedeño, SS, Houston Astros
Milt Cuyler, OF, Detroit Tigers
Luis González, OF, Houston Astros
Ray Lankford, OF, St. Louis Cardinals
Mark Leiter, RHP, Detroit Tigers
Al Osuna, LHP, Houston Astros

1992
Todd Hundley, C, New York Mets
Eric Karros, 1B, Los Angeles Dodgers
Jeff Kent, 2B, New York Mets
Scott Livingstone, 3B, Detroit Tigers
Pat Listach, SS, Milwaukee Brewers
Moisés Alou, OF, Montreal Expos
Kenny Lofton, OF, Cleveland Indians
Reggie Sanders, OF, Cincinnati Reds
Cal Eldred, RHP, Milwaukee Brewers
Dave Fleming, LHP, Seattle Mariners

1993
Mike Piazza, C, Los Angeles Dodgers †
J. T. Snow, 1B, California Angels
Carlos García, 2B, Pittsburgh Pirates
Mike Lansing, 3B, Montreal Expos
Wil Cordero, SS, Montreal Expos
Jeff Conine, OF, Florida Marlins
Wayne Kirby, OF, Cleveland Indians
Tim Salmon, OF, California Angels
Greg McMichael, RHP, Atlanta Braves
Steve Cooke, LHP, Pittsburgh Pirates

1994
Javy López, C, Atlanta Braves
Bob Hamelin, 1B, Kansas City Royals
John Patterson, 2B, San Francisco Giants
José Oliva, 3B, Atlanta Braves
Chris Gomez, SS, Detroit Tigers
Ryan Klesko, OF, Atlanta Braves
Raúl Mondesí, OF, Los Angeles Dodgers
Manny Ramírez, OF, Cleveland Indians
Joey Hamilton, RHP, San Diego Padres
Brian Anderson, LHP, California Angels

1995
Charles Johnson, C, Florida Marlins
John Mabry, 1B, St. Louis Cardinals
Ray Durham, 2B, Chicago White Sox
Chipper Jones, 3B, Atlanta Braves †
Orlando Miller, SS, Houston Astros
Garret Anderson, OF, California Angels
Marty Cordova, OF, Minnesota Twins
Shawn Green, OF, Toronto Blue Jays
Hideo Nomo, RHP, Los Angeles Dodgers
Carlos Perez, LHP, Montreal Expos

1996
Jason Kendall, C, Pittsburgh Pirates
Tony Clark, 1B, Detroit Tigers
Tony Batista, 2B, Oakland Athletics
Joe Randa, 3B, Kansas City Royals
Derek Jeter, SS, New York Yankees †
Jermaine Dye, OF, Atlanta Braves
Todd Hollandsworth, OF, Los Angeles Dodgers
F. P. Santangelo, OF, Montreal Expos
Alan Benes, RHP, St. Louis Cardinals
Billy Wagner, LHP, Houston Astros

1997
Scott Hatteberg, C, Boston Red Sox
Dmitri Young, 1B, St. Louis Cardinals
Wilton Guerrero, 2B, Los Angeles Dodgers
Scott Rolen, 3B, Philadelphia Phillies †
Nomar Garciaparra, SS, Boston Red Sox
José Cruz Jr., OF, Toronto Blue Jays
José Guillén, OF, Pittsburgh Pirates
Andruw Jones, OF, Atlanta Braves
Jason Dickson, RHP, Anaheim Angels
Mike Holtz, LHP, Anaheim Angels

1998
A. J. Hinch, C, Oakland Athletics
Todd Helton, 1B, Colorado Rockies
Miguel Cairo, 2B, Tampa Bay Devil Rays
Bob Smith, 3B, Tampa Bay Devil Rays
Mike Caruso, SS, Chicago White Sox
Ben Grieve, OF, Oakland Athletics
Mark Kotsay, OF, Florida Marlins
Magglio Ordóñez, OF, Chicago White Sox
Kerry Wood, RHP, Chicago Cubs
Jesús Sánchez, LHP, Florida Marlins

1999
Ben Davis, C, San Diego Padres
Brian Daubach, 1B, Boston Red Sox
Warren Morris, 2B, Pittsburgh Pirates
Corey Koskie, 3B, Minnesota Twins
Álex González, SS, Florida Marlins
Carlos Beltrán, OF, Kansas City Royals
Chris Singleton, OF, Chicago White Sox
Preston Wilson, OF, Florida Marlins
Billy Koch, RHP, Toronto Blue Jays
John Halama, LHP, Seattle Mariners

2000s

2000
Bengie Molina, C, Anaheim Angels
Pat Burrell, 1B, Philadelphia Phillies
Adam Kennedy, 2B, Anaheim Angels
Mike Lamb, 3B, Texas Rangers
Rafael Furcal, SS, Atlanta Braves
Terrence Long, OF, Oakland Athletics
Jay Payton, OF, New York Mets
Mark Quinn, OF, Kansas City Royals
Kazuhiro Sasaki, RHP, Seattle Mariners
Mark Redman, LHP, Minnesota Twins

2001
Shawn Wooten, C, Anaheim Angels
Craig Wilson, 1B, Pittsburgh Pirates
Alfonso Soriano, 2B, New York Yankees
Albert Pujols, 3B, St. Louis Cardinals
Jimmy Rollins, SS, Philadelphia Phillies
Adam Dunn, OF, Cincinnati Reds
Tsuyoshi Shinjo, OF, New York Mets
Ichiro Suzuki, OF, Seattle Mariners
Roy Oswalt, RHP, Houston Astros
CC Sabathia, LHP, Cleveland Indians

2002
Gerónimo Gil, C, Baltimore Orioles
Nick Johnson, 1B, New York Yankees
Mark Ellis, 2B, Oakland Athletics
Eric Hinske, 3B, Toronto Blue Jays
Ramón Santiago, SS, Detroit Tigers
Austin Kearns, OF, Cincinnati Reds
Alex Sánchez, OF, Milwaukee Brewers
Brad Wilkerson, OF, Montreal Expos
Jason Jennings, RHP, Colorado Rockies
Damian Moss, LHP, Atlanta Braves

2003
Miguel Olivo, C, Chicago White Sox
Mark Teixeira, 1B, Texas Rangers
Bo Hart, 2B, St. Louis Cardinals
Ty Wigginton, 3B, New York Mets
Ángel Berroa, SS, Kansas City Royals
Rocco Baldelli, OF, Tampa Bay Devil Rays
Jody Gerut, OF, Cleveland Indians
Scott Podsednik, OF, Milwaukee Brewers
Brandon Webb, RHP, Arizona Diamondbacks
Dontrelle Willis, LHP, Florida Marlins

2004
Joe Mauer, C, Minnesota Twins
Adam LaRoche, 1B, Atlanta Braves
Aaron Miles, 2B, Colorado Rockies
Chad Tracy, 3B, Arizona Diamondbacks
Khalil Greene, SS, San Diego Padres
Jason Bay, OF, Pittsburgh Pirates (unanimous selection)
Matt Holliday, OF, Colorado Rockies
Terrmel Sledge, OF, Montreal Expos
Daniel Cabrera, RHP, Baltimore Orioles
Mike Gonzalez, LHP, Pittsburgh Pirates

2005
Brian McCann, C, Atlanta Braves
Dan Johnson, 1B, Oakland Athletics (unanimous selection)
Tadahito Iguchi, 2B, Chicago White Sox
Garrett Atkins, 3B, Colorado Rockies (unanimous selection)
Russ Adams, SS, Toronto Blue Jays (unanimous selection)
Jeff Francoeur, OF, Atlanta Braves
Jonny Gomes, OF, Tampa Bay Devil Rays
Willy Taveras, OF, Houston Astros
Huston Street, RHP, Oakland Athletics (unanimous selection)
Gustavo Chacín, LHP, Toronto Blue Jays (unanimous selection)

2006
Russell Martin, C, Los Angeles Dodgers
Prince Fielder, 1B, Milwaukee Brewers (unanimous selection)
Dan Uggla, 2B, Florida Marlins (unanimous selection)
Ryan Zimmerman, 3B, Washington Nationals (unanimous selection)
Hanley Ramírez, SS, Florida Marlins (unanimous selection)
Melky Cabrera, OF, New York Yankees
Andre Ethier, OF, Los Angeles Dodgers
Nick Markakis, OF, Baltimore Orioles
Justin Verlander, RHP, Detroit Tigers
Francisco Liriano, LHP, Minnesota Twins

2007
Carlos Ruiz, C, Philadelphia Phillies
James Loney, 1B, Los Angeles Dodgers (unanimous selection)
Dustin Pedroia, 2B, Boston Red Sox
Ryan Braun, 3B, Milwaukee Brewers (unanimous selection)
Troy Tulowitzki, SS, Colorado Rockies
Delmon Young, OF, Tampa Bay Devil Rays (unanimous selection)
Chris Young, OF, Arizona Diamondbacks (unanimous selection)
Hunter Pence, OF, Houston Astros (unanimous selection)
Brian Bannister, RHP, Kansas City Royals
Hideki Okajima, LHP, Boston Red Sox

2008
Geovany Soto, C, Chicago Cubs
Joey Votto, 1B, Cincinnati Reds
Alexei Ramírez, 2B, Chicago White Sox
Evan Longoria, 3B, Tampa Bay Rays
Mike Avilés, SS, Kansas City Royals
Jay Bruce, OF, Cincinnati Reds
Denard Span, OF, Minnesota Twins
David Murphy, OF, Texas Rangers
Brad Ziegler, RHP, Oakland Athletics
John Lannan, LHP, Washington Nationals

2009
Omir Santos, C, New York Mets
Travis Ishikawa, 1B, San Francisco Giants
Chris Getz, 2B, Chicago White Sox
Gordon Beckham, 3B, Chicago White Sox
Elvis Andrus, SS, Texas Rangers
Chris Coghlan, OF, Florida Marlins
Andrew McCutchen, OF, Pittsburgh Pirates
Nolan Reimold, OF, Baltimore Orioles
Tommy Hanson, RHP, Atlanta Braves
J. A. Happ, LHP, Philadelphia Phillies

2010s

2010
Buster Posey, C, San Francisco Giants
Gaby Sánchez, 1B, Florida Marlins
Neil Walker, 2B, Pittsburgh Pirates
Danny Valencia, 3B, Minnesota Twins
Starlin Castro, SS, Chicago Cubs
Austin Jackson, OF, Detroit Tigers
Giancarlo Stanton, OF, Florida Marlins
Jason Heyward, OF, Atlanta Braves
Stephen Strasburg, RHP, Washington Nationals
Jaime García, LHP, St. Louis Cardinals
Neftalí Feliz, RP, Texas Rangers

2011
J. P. Arencibia, C, Toronto Blue Jays
Mark Trumbo, 1B, Los Angeles Angels of Anaheim
Danny Espinosa, 2B, Washington Nationals
Brett Lawrie, 3B, Toronto Blue Jays
Dee Gordon, SS, Los Angeles Dodgers
Desmond Jennings, OF, Tampa Bay Rays
Josh Reddick, OF, Boston Red Sox
Ben Revere, OF, Minnesota Twins
Jeremy Hellickson, Starting Pitcher, Tampa Bay Rays
Craig Kimbrel, Relief Pitcher, Atlanta Braves

2012
Wilin Rosario, C, Colorado Rockies
Anthony Rizzo, 1B, Chicago Cubs
Steve Lombardozzi Jr., 2B, Washington Nationals
Todd Frazier, 3B, Cincinnati Reds
Zack Cozart, SS, Cincinnati Reds
Yoenis Céspedes, OF, Oakland Athletics
Bryce Harper, OF, Washington Nationals
Mike Trout, OF, Los Angeles Angels of Anaheim
Yu Darvish, RHP, Texas Rangers
Wade Miley, LHP, Arizona Diamondbacks
Addison Reed, RP, Chicago White Sox

2013
Evan Gattis, C, Atlanta Braves
Matt Adams, 1B, St. Louis Cardinals
Jedd Gyorko, 2B, San Diego Padres
Nolan Arenado, 3B, Colorado Rockies
José Iglesias, SS, Boston Red Sox/Detroit Tigers
Wil Myers, OF, Tampa Bay Rays
Yasiel Puig, OF, Los Angeles Dodgers
Christian Yelich, OF, Miami Marlins
Jose Fernández, RHP, Miami Marlins
Hyun-jin Ryu, LHP, Los Angeles Dodgers
Jim Henderson, RP, Milwaukee Brewers

2014
Travis d'Arnaud, C, New York Mets
Jose Abreu, 1B, Chicago White Sox
Kolten Wong, 2B, St. Louis Cardinals
Nick Castellanos, 3B, Detroit Tigers
Xander Bogaerts, SS, Boston Red Sox
Billy Hamilton, OF, Cincinnati Reds
Danny Santana, OF, Minnesota Twins
George Springer, OF, Houston Astros
Masahiro Tanaka, RHP, New York Yankees
Roenis Elías, LHP, Seattle Mariners
Dellin Betances, RP, New York Yankees

2015
J. T. Realmuto, C, Miami Marlins
Justin Bour, 1B, Miami Marlins
Addison Russell, 2B, Chicago Cubs
Kris Bryant, 3B, Chicago Cubs
Carlos Correa, SS, Houston Astros
Michael Conforto, OF, New York Mets
Randal Grichuk, OF, St. Louis Cardinals
Kyle Schwarber, OF, Chicago Cubs
Noah Syndergaard, RHP, New York Mets
Carlos Rodon, LHP, Chicago White Sox
Roberto Osuna, RP, Toronto Blue Jays
Miguel Sanó, DH, Minnesota Twins

2016
Gary Sánchez, C, New York Yankees
Tommy Joseph, 1B, Philadelphia Phillies
Ryan Schimpf, 2B, San Diego Padres
Alex Bregman, 3B, Houston Astros
Corey Seager, SS, Los Angeles Dodgers
Nomar Mazara, OF, Texas Rangers
Tyler Naquin, OF, Cleveland Indians
Trea Turner, OF, Washington Nationals
Kenta Maeda, RHP, Los Angeles Dodgers
Julio Urias, LHP, Los Angeles Dodgers
Seung-hwan Oh, RP, St. Louis Cardinals

2017
Manny Pina, C, Milwaukee Brewers
Cody Bellinger, 1B, Los Angeles Dodgers
Ian Happ, 2B, Chicago Cubs
Rafael Devers, 3B, Boston Red Sox
Paul DeJong, SS, St. Louis Cardinals
Andrew Benintendi, OF, Boston Red Sox
Aaron Judge, OF, New York Yankees
Trey Mancini, OF, Baltimore Orioles
German Marquez, RHP, Colorado Rockies
Jordan Montgomery, LHP, New York Yankees
Josh Hader, RP, Milwaukee Brewers

2018
Jorge Alfaro, C, Philadelphia Phillies
Ryan O'Hearn, 1B, Kansas City Royals
Gleyber Torres, 2B, New York Yankees
Miguel Andújar, 3B, New York Yankees
Willy Adames, SS, Tampa Bay Rays
Ronald Acuña Jr., OF, Atlanta Braves
Harrison Bader, OF, St. Louis Cardinals
Juan Soto, OF, Washington Nationals
Walker Buehler, RHP, Los Angeles Dodgers
Ryan Yarbrough, LHP, Tampa Bay Rays
A.J. Minter, RP, Atlanta Braves
Shohei Ohtani, P/DH, Los Angeles Angels

2019
Will Smith, C, Los Angeles Dodgers
Pete Alonso, 1B, New York Mets
Keston Hiura, 2B, Milwaukee Brewers
Vladimir Guerrero Jr., 3B, Toronto Blue Jays
Fernando Tatís Jr., SS, San Diego Padres
Eloy Jimenez, OF, Chicago White Sox
Bryan Reynolds, OF, Pittsburgh Pirates
Victor Robles, OF, Washington Nationals
Mike Soroka, RHP, Atlanta Braves
John Means, LHP, Baltimore Orioles
Nick Anderson, RP, Tampa Bay Rays 
Yordan Alvarez, DH, Houston Astros

2020s

2020
Sean Murphy, C, Oakland Athletics
Jared Walsh, 1B, Los Angeles Angels
Jake Cronenworth, 2B, San Diego Padres
Alec Bohm, 3B, Philadelphia Phillies
Willi Castro, SS, Detroit Tigers
Kyle Lewis, OF, Seattle Mariners
Ryan Mountcastle, OF, Baltimore Orioles
Luis Robert, OF, Chicago White Sox
Tony Gonsolin, RHP, Los Angeles Dodgers
Kwang-hyun Kim, LHP, St. Louis Cardinals
Devin Williams, RP, Milwaukee Brewers

2021
Tyler Stephenson, C, Cincinnati Reds
Ryan Mountcastle, 1B, Baltimore Orioles
Jonathan India, 2B, Cincinnati Reds
Patrick Wisdom, 3B, Chicago Cubs
Wander Franco, SS, Tampa Bay Rays
Randy Arozarena, OF, Tampa Bay Rays
Adolis García, OF, Texas Rangers
Dylan Carlson, OF, St. Louis Cardinals
Luis García, RHP, Houston Astros
Trevor Rogers, LHP, Miami Marlins
Emmanuel Clase, RP, Cleveland Indians

2022
Adley Rutschman, C, Baltimore Orioles
Joey Meneses, 1B, Washington Nationals
Brendan Donovan, 2B, St. Louis Cardinals
Bobby Witt Jr., 3B, Kansas City Royals
Jeremy Peña, SS, Houston Astros
Julio Rodríguez, OF, Seattle Mariners
Michael Harris II, OF, Atlanta Braves
Steven Kwan, OF, Cleveland Guardians
Spencer Strider, RHP, Atlanta Braves
Reid Detmers, LHP, Los Angeles Angels
Alexis Díaz, RP, Cincinnati Reds
Vinnie Pasquantino, DH, Kansas City Royals

See also
Topps All-Star Rookie Team main page
Major League Baseball Rookie of the Year Award
This Year in Baseball Awards Rookie of the Year
Players Choice Awards Outstanding Rookie
Baseball America Rookie of the Year
Sporting News Rookie of the Year Award
Major League Baseball Rookie of the Month Award
Baseball awards

References